Castle Bytham railway station was a station in Castle Bytham. It was Midland Railway property but train services were operated by the Midland and Great Northern Joint Railway (M&GN). The station and line closed in 1959 along with most of the M&GN.

History

This station was rather unusual, being a single platform in a cutting through the village. The station was not originally planned by the railway, but was added after considerable local lobbying. Outside the village, the line of the railway now forms a road crossing under the A1.

The line officially became M&GN property a few miles east at Little Bytham Junction, where it crossed the Great Northern Railway main line. The GNR had powers to make a junction here but never did so. The nearest station on the GNR was Little Bytham.

Routes

References

 Track plans and Photographs

Disused railway stations in Lincolnshire
Former Midland Railway stations
Railway stations in Great Britain opened in 1898
Railway stations in Great Britain closed in 1959